Metacognition is an awareness of one's thought processes and an understanding of the patterns behind them. The term comes from the root word meta, meaning "beyond", or "on top of". Metacognition can take many forms, such as reflecting on one's ways of thinking and knowing when and how to use particular strategies for problem-solving. There are generally two components of metacognition: (1) knowledge about cognition and (2) regulation of cognition.

Metamemory, defined as knowing about memory and mnemonic strategies, is an especially important form of metacognition. Academic research on metacognitive processing across cultures is in the early stages, but there are indications that further work may provide better outcomes in cross-cultural learning between teachers and students.

Writings on metacognition date back at least as far as two works by the Greek philosopher Aristotle (384–322 BC): On the Soul and the Parva Naturalia.

Definitions

This higher-level cognition was given the label metacognition by American developmental psychologist John H. Flavell (1976).

The term metacognition literally means 'above cognition', and is used to indicate cognition about cognition, or more informally, thinking about thinking. Flavell defined metacognition as knowledge about cognition and control of cognition. For example, a person is engaging in metacognition if they notice that they are having more trouble learning A than B, or if it strikes them that they should double-check C before accepting it as fact. J. H. Flavell (1976, p. 232).  Andreas Demetriou's theory (one of the neo-Piagetian theories of cognitive development) used the term hyper-cognition to refer to self-monitoring, self-representation, and self-regulation processes, which are regarded as integral components of the human mind. Moreover, with his colleagues, he showed that these processes participate in general intelligence, together with processing efficiency and reasoning, which have traditionally been considered to compose fluid intelligence.

Metacognition also involves thinking about one's own thinking process such as study skills, memory capabilities, and the ability to monitor learning.  This concept needs to be explicitly taught along with content instruction.

Metacognitive knowledge is about one's own cognitive processes and the understanding of how to regulate those processes to maximize learning and decision-making.

Some types of metacognitive knowledge would include:
 Content knowledge (declarative knowledge) which is understanding one's own capabilities, such as a student evaluating their own knowledge of a subject in a class. It is notable that not all metacognition is accurate. Studies have shown that students often mistake lack of effort with understanding in evaluating themselves and their overall knowledge of a concept. Also, greater confidence in having performed well is associated with less accurate metacognitive judgment of the performance.
 Task knowledge (procedural knowledge), which is how one perceives the difficulty of a task which is the content, length, and the type of assignment. The study mentioned in Content knowledge also deals with a person's ability to evaluate the difficulty of a task related to their overall performance on the task. Again, the accuracy of this knowledge was skewed as students who thought their way was better/easier also seemed to perform worse on evaluations, while students who were rigorously and continually evaluated reported to not be as confident but still did better on initial evaluations.
 Strategic knowledge (conditional knowledge) is one's own capability for using strategies to learn information. Young children are not particularly good at this; it is not until students are in upper elementary school that they begin to develop an understanding of effective strategies.
Metacognition is a general term encompassing the study of memory-monitoring and self-regulation, meta-reasoning, consciousness/awareness and autonoetic consciousness/self-awareness. In practice these capacities are used to regulate one's own cognition, to maximize one's potential to think, learn and to the evaluation of proper ethical/moral rules. It can also lead to a reduction in response time for a given situation as a result of heightened awareness, and potentially reduce the time to complete problems or tasks.

In the domain of experimental psychology, an influential distinction in metacognition (proposed by T. O. Nelson & L. Narens) is between Monitoring—making judgments about the strength of one's memories—and Control—using those judgments to guide behavior (in particular, to guide study choices). Dunlosky, Serra, and Baker (2007) covered this distinction in a review of metamemory research that focused on how findings from this domain can be applied to other areas of applied research.

In the domain of cognitive neuroscience, metacognitive monitoring and control has been viewed as a function of the prefrontal cortex, which receives (monitors) sensory signals from other cortical regions and implements control using feedback loops (see chapters by Schwartz & Bacon and Shimamura, in Dunlosky & Bjork, 2008).

Metacognition is studied in the domain of artificial intelligence and modelling. Therefore, it is the domain of interest of emergent systemics.

Related concepts 
A number of theorists have proposed a common mechanism behind theory of mind, the ability to model and understand the mental states of others, and metacognition, which involves a theory of one's own mind's function. Direct evidence for this link is limited.

Several researchers have related mindfulness to metacognition. Mindfulness includes at least two mental processes: a stream of mental events and a higher level awareness of the flow of events. Mindfulness can be distinguished from some metacognition processes in that it is a conscious process.

Components
Metacognition is classified into three components:

 Metacognitive knowledge (also called metacognitive awareness) is what individuals know about themselves and others as cognitive processors.
 Metacognitive regulation is the regulation of cognition and learning experiences through a set of activities that help people control their learning.
 Metacognitive experiences are those experiences that have something to do with the current, on-going cognitive endeavor.

Metacognition refers to a level of thinking that involves active control over the process of thinking that is used in learning situations.  Planning the way to approach a learning task, monitoring comprehension, and evaluating the progress towards the completion of a task: these are skills that are metacognitive in their nature.

Metacognition includes at least three different types of metacognitive awareness when considering metacognitive knowledge: 
 Declarative knowledge: refers to knowledge about oneself as a learner and about what factors can influence one's performance. Declarative knowledge can also be referred to as "world knowledge".
 Procedural knowledge: refers to knowledge about doing things. This type of knowledge is displayed as heuristics and strategies. A high degree of procedural knowledge can allow individuals to perform tasks more automatically. This is achieved through a large variety of strategies that can be accessed more efficiently.
 Conditional knowledge: refers to knowing when and why to use declarative and procedural knowledge. It allows students to allocate their resources when using strategies. This in turn allows the strategies to become more effective.

Similar to metacognitive knowledge, metacognitive regulation or "regulation of cognition" contains three skills that are essential. 
 Planning: refers to the appropriate selection of strategies and the correct allocation of resources that affect task performance.
 Monitoring: refers to one's awareness of comprehension and task performance
 Evaluating: refers to appraising the final product of a task and the efficiency at which the task was performed. This can include re-evaluating strategies that were used.

Similarly, maintaining motivation to see a task to completion is also a metacognitive skill. The ability to become aware of distracting stimuli – both internal and external – and sustain effort over time also involves metacognitive or executive functions. The theory that metacognition has a critical role to play in successful learning means it is important that it be demonstrated by both students and teachers.

Students who underwent metacognitive training including pretesting, self evaluation, and creating study plans performed better on exams. They are self-regulated learners who utilize the "right tool for the job" and modify learning strategies and skills based on their awareness of effectiveness. Individuals with a high level of metacognitive knowledge and skill identify blocks to learning as early as possible and change "tools" or strategies to ensure goal attainment. Swanson (1990) found that metacognitive knowledge can compensate for IQ and lack of prior knowledge when comparing fifth and sixth grade students' problem solving. Students with a high-metacognition were reported to have used fewer strategies, but solved problems more effectively than low-metacognition students, regardless of IQ or prior knowledge. In one study examining students who send text messages during college lectures, it was suggested that students with higher metacognitive abilities were less likely than other students to have their learning affected by using a mobile phone in class.

Metacognologists are aware of their own strengths and weaknesses, the nature of the task at hand, and available "tools" or skills. A broader repertoire of "tools" also assists in goal attainment. When "tools" are general, generic, and context independent, they are more likely to be useful in different types of learning situations.

Another distinction in metacognition is executive management and strategic knowledge. Executive management processes involve planning, monitoring, evaluating and revising one's own thinking processes and products. Strategic knowledge involves knowing what (factual or declarative knowledge), knowing when and why (conditional or contextual knowledge) and knowing how (procedural or methodological knowledge). Both executive management and strategic knowledge metacognition are needed to self-regulate one's own thinking and learning.

Finally, there is no distinction between domain-general and domain-specific metacognitive skills.  This means that metacognitive skills are domain-general in nature and there are no specific skills for certain subject areas. The metacognitive skills that are used to review an essay are the same as those that are used to verify an answer to a math question.

Social metacognition 
Although metacognition has thus far been discussed in relation to the self, recent research in the field has suggested that this view is overly restrictive. Instead, it is argued that metacognition research should also include beliefs about others' mental processes, the influence of culture on those beliefs, and on beliefs about ourselves. This "expansionist view" proposes that it is impossible to fully understand metacognition without considering the situational norms and cultural expectations that influence those same conceptions. This combination of social psychology and metacognition is referred to as social metacognition.

Social metacognition can include ideas and perceptions that relate to social cognition. Additionally, social metacognition can include judging the cognition of others, such as judging the perceptions and emotional states of others. This is in part because the process of judging others is similar to judging the self. However, individuals have less information about the people they are judging; therefore, judging others tends to be more inaccurate; an effect called the fundamental attribution error. Having similar cognitions can buffer against this inaccuracy and can be helpful for teams or organizations, as well as interpersonal relationships.

Social metacognition and the self concept 
An example of the interaction between social metacognition and self-concept can be found in examining implicit theories about the self. Implicit theories can cover a wide range of constructs about how the self operates, but two are especially relevant here; entity theory and incrementalist theory. Entity theory proposes that an individual's self-attributes and abilities are fixed and stable, while incrementalist theory proposes that these same constructs can be changed through effort and experience. Entity theorists are susceptible to learned helplessness because they may feel that circumstances are outside their control (i.e. there's nothing that could have been done to make things better), thus they may give up easily. Incremental theorists react differently when faced with failure: they desire to master challenges, and therefore adopt a mastery-oriented pattern.  They immediately began to consider various ways that they could approach the task differently, and they increase their efforts. Cultural beliefs can act on this as well. For example, a person who has accepted a cultural belief that memory loss is an unavoidable consequence of old age may avoid cognitively demanding tasks as they age, thus accelerating cognitive decline. Similarly, a woman who is aware of the stereotype that purports that women are not good at mathematics may perform worse on tests of mathematical ability or avoid mathematics altogether. These examples demonstrate that the metacognitive beliefs people hold about the self - which may be socially or culturally transmitted - can have important effects on persistence, performance, and motivation.

Attitudes as a function of social metacognition 
The way that individuals think about attitude greatly affects the way that they behave. Metacognitions about attitudes influence how individuals act, and especially how they interact with others.

Some metacognitive characteristics of attitudes include importance, certainty, and perceived knowledge, and they influence behavior in different ways. Attitude importance is the strongest predictor of behavior and can predict information seeking behaviors in individuals. Attitude importance is also more likely to influence behavior than certainty of the attitude. When considering a social behavior like voting a person may hold high importance but low certainty. This means that they will likely vote, even if they are unsure whom to vote for. Meanwhile, a person who is very certain of who they want to vote for, may not actually vote if it is of low importance to them. This also applies to interpersonal relationships. A person might hold a lot of favorable knowledge about their family, but they may not maintain close relations with their family if it is of low importance.

Metacognitive characteristics of attitudes may be key to understanding how attitudes change. Research shows that the frequency of positive or negative thoughts is the biggest factor in attitude change. A person may believe that climate change is occurring but have negative thoughts toward it such as "If I accept the responsibilities of climate change, I must change my lifestyle". These individuals would not likely change their behavior compared to someone that thinks positively about the same issue such as "By using less electricity, I will be helping the planet".

Another way to increase the likelihood of behavior change is by influencing the source of the attitude. An individual's personal thoughts and ideas have a much greater impact on the attitude compared to ideas of others. Therefore, when people view lifestyle changes as coming from themselves, the effects are more powerful than if the changes were coming from a friend or family member. These thoughts can be re-framed in a way that emphasizes personal importance, such as "I want to stop smoking because it is important to me" rather than "quitting smoking is important to my family". More research needs to be conducted on culture differences and importance of group ideology, which may alter these results.

Social metacognition and stereotypes 
People have secondary cognitions about the appropriateness, justifiability, and social judgability of their own stereotypic beliefs. People know that it is typically unacceptable to make stereotypical judgments and make conscious efforts not to do so. Subtle social cues can influence these conscious efforts. For example, when given a false sense of confidence about their ability to judge others, people will return to relying on social stereotypes. Cultural backgrounds influence social metacognitive assumptions, including stereotypes. For example, cultures without the stereotype that memory declines with old age display no age differences in memory performance.

When it comes to making judgments about other people, implicit theories about the stability versus malleability of human characteristics predict differences in social stereotyping as well. Holding an entity theory of traits increases the tendency for people to see similarity among group members and utilize stereotyped judgments. For example, compared to those holding incremental beliefs, people who hold entity beliefs of traits use more stereotypical trait judgments of ethnic and occupational groups as well as form more extreme trait judgments of new groups. When an individual's assumptions about a group combine with their implicit theories, more stereotypical judgments may be formed. Stereotypes that one believes others hold about them are called metastereotypes.

Animal metacognition

In nonhuman primates

Chimpanzees 
Beran, Smith, and Perdue (2013) found that chimpanzees showed metacognitive monitoring in the information-seeking task. In their studies, three language-trained chimpanzees were asked to use the keyboard to name the food item in order to get the food. The food in the container was either visible to them or they had to move toward the container to see its contents. Studies shown that chimpanzees were more often to check what was in the container first if the food in the container was hidden. But when the food was visible to them, the chimpanzees were more likely to directly approach the keyboard and reported the identity of the food without looking again in the container. Their results suggested that chimpanzees know what they have seen and show effective information-seeking behavior when information is incomplete.

Rhesus macaques (Macaca mulatta) 
Morgan et al. (2014) investigated whether rhesus macaques can make both retrospective and prospective metacognitive judgments on the same memory task. Risk choices were introduced to assess the monkey's confidence about their memories. Two male rhesus monkeys (Macaca mulatta) were trained in a computerized token economy task first in which they can accumulate tokens to exchange food rewards. Monkeys were presented with multiple images of common objects simultaneously and then a moving border appearing on the screen indicating the target. Immediately following the presentation, the target images and some distractors were shown in the test. During the training phase, monkeys received immediate feedback after they made responses. They can earn two tokens if they make correct choices but lost two tokens if they were wrong.

In Experiment 1, the confidence rating was introduced after they completed their responses in order to test the retrospective metamemory judgments. After each response, a high-risk and a low-risk choice were provided to the monkeys. They could earn one token regardless of their accuracy if they choose the low-risk option. When they chose high-risk, they were rewarded with three tokens if their memory response was correct on that trial but lost three tokens if they made incorrect responses. Morgan and colleagues (2014) found a significant positive correlation between memory accuracy and risk choice in two rhesus monkeys. That is, they were more likely to select the high-risk option if they answered correctly in the working memory task but select the low-risk option if they were failed in the memory task.

Then Morgan et al. (2014) examine monkeys’ prospective metacognitive monitoring skills in Experiment 2. This study employed the same design except that two monkeys were asked to make low-risk or high-risk confidence judgment before they make actual responses to measure their judgments about future events. Similarly, the monkeys were more often to choose high-risk confidence judgment before answering correctly in working memory task and tended to choose the low-risk option before providing an incorrect response. These two studies indicated that rhesus monkeys can accurately monitor their performance and provided evidence of metacognitive abilities in monkeys.

In rats 
In addition to nonhuman primates, other animals are also shown metacognition. Foote and Crystal (2007) provided the first evidence that rats have the knowledge of what they know in a perceptual discrimination task. Rats were required to classify brief noises as short or long. Some noises with intermediate durations were difficult to discriminate as short or long. Rats were provided with an option to decline to take the test on some trials but were forced to make responses on other trials. If they chose to take the test and respond correctly, they would receive a high reward but no reward if their classification of noises was incorrect. But if the rats decline to take the test, they would be guaranteed a smaller reward. The results showed that rats were more likely to decline to take the test when the difficulty of noise discrimination increased, suggesting rats knew they do not have the correct answers and declined to take the test to receive the reward. Another finding is that the performance was better when they had chosen to take the test compared with if the rats were forced to make responses, proving that some uncertain trials were declined to improve the accuracy.

These responses pattern might be attributed to actively monitor their own mental states. Alternatively, external cues such as environmental cue associations could be used to explain their behaviors in the discrimination task. Rats might have learned the association between intermediate stimuli and the decline option over time. Longer response latencies or some features inherent to stimuli can serve as discriminative cues to decline tests. Therefore, Templer, Lee, and Preston (2017) utilized an olfactory-based delayed match to sample (DMTS) memory task to assess whether rats were capable of metacognitive responding adaptively. Rats were exposed to sample odor first and chose to either decline or take the four-choice memory test after a delay. The correct choices of odor were associated with high reward and incorrect choices have no reward. The decline options were accompanied by a small reward.

In experiment 2, some “no-sample” trials were added in the memory test in which no odor was provided before the test. They hypothesized that rats would decline more often when there was no sample odor presented compared with odor presented if rats could internally assess the memory strength. Alternatively, if the decline option was motivated by external environmental cues, the rats would be less likely to decline the test because no available external cues were presented. The results showed that rats were more likely to decline the test in no-sample trials relative to normal sample trials, supporting the notion that rats can track their internal memory strength.

To rule out other potential possibilities, they also manipulated memory strength by providing the sampled odor twice and varying the retention interval between the learning and the test. Templer and colleagues (2017) found rats were less likely to decline the test if they had been exposed to the sample twice, suggesting that their memory strength for these samples was increased. Longer delayed sample test was more often declined than short delayed test because their memory was better after the short delay. Overall, their series of studies demonstrated that rats could distinguish between remembering and forgetting and rule out the possibilities that decline use was modulated by the external cues such as environmental cue associations.

In pigeons 
Research on metacognition of pigeons has shown limited success. Inman and Shettleworth (1999) employed the delayed match to sample (DMTS) procedure to test pigeons’ metacognition. Pigeons were presented with one of three sample shapes (a triangle, a square, or a star) and then they were required to peck the matched sample when three stimuli simultaneously appeared on the screen at the end of the retention interval. A safe key was also presented in some trials next to three sample stimuli which allow them to decline that trial. Pigeons received a high reward for pecking correct stimuli, a middle-level reward for pecking the safe key, and nothing if they pecked the wrong stimuli. Inman and Shettleworth's (1999) first experiment found that pigeons’ accuracies were lower and they were more likely to choose the safe key as the retention interval between presentation of stimuli and test increased. However, in Experiment 2, when pigeons were presented with the option to escape or take the test before the test phase, there was no relationship between choosing the safe key and longer retention interval. Adams and Santi (2011) also employed the DMTS procedure in a perceptual discrimination task during which pigeons were trained to discriminate between durations of illumination. Pigeons did not choose the escape option more often as the retention interval increased during initial testing. After extended training, they learned to escape the difficult trials. However, these patterns might be attributed to the possibility that pigeons learned the association between escape responses and longer retention delay.

In addition to DMTS paradigm, Castro and Wasserman (2013) proved that pigeons can exhibit adaptive and efficient information-seeking behavior in the same-different discrimination task. Two arrays of items were presented simultaneously in which the two sets of items were either identical or different from one another. Pigeons were required to distinguish between the two arrays of items in which the level of difficulty was varied. Pigeons were provided with an “Information” button and a “Go” button on some trials that they could increase the number of items in the arrays to make the discrimination easier or they can prompt to make responses by pecking the Go button. Castro and Wasserman found that the more difficult the task, the more often pigeons chose the information button to solve the discrimination task. This behavioral pattern indicated that pigeons could evaluate the difficulty of the task internally and actively search for information when is necessary.

In dogs 
Dogs have shown a certain level of metacognition that they are sensitive to information they have acquired or not. Belger & Bräuer (2018) examined whether dogs could seek additional information when facing uncertain situations. The experimenter put the reward behind one of the two fences in which dogs can see or cannot see where the reward was hidden. After that, dogs were encouraged to find the reward by walking around one fence. The dogs checked more frequently before selecting the fence when they did not see the baiting process compared with when they saw where the reward was hidden. However, contrary to apes, dogs did not show more checking behaviors when the delay between baiting the reward and selecting the fence was longer. Their findings suggested that dogs have some aspect of information-searching behaviors but less flexibly compared to apes.

In dolphins 
Smith et al. (1995) evaluated whether dolphins have the ability of metacognitive monitoring in an auditory threshold paradigm. A bottlenosed dolphin was trained to discriminate between high-frequency tones and low-frequency tones. An escape option was available on some trials associated with a small reward. Their studies showed that dolphins could appropriately use the uncertain response when the trials were difficult to discriminate.

Debate 
There is consensus that nonhuman primates, especially great apes and rhesus monkeys, exhibit metacognitive control and monitoring behaviors. But less convergent evidence was found in other animals such as rats and pigeons. Some researchers criticized these methods and posited that these performances might be accounted for by low-level conditioning mechanisms. Animals learned the association between reward and external stimuli through simple reinforcement models. However, many studies have demonstrated that the reinforcement model alone cannot explain animals’ behavioral patterns. Animals have shown adaptive metacognitive behavior even with the absence of concrete reward.

Strategies
Metacognitive-like processes are especially ubiquitous when it comes to the discussion of self-regulated learning. Self-regulation requires metacognition by looking at one's awareness of their learning and planning further learning methodology. Attentive metacognition is a salient feature of good self-regulated learners, but does not guarantee automatic application. Reinforcing collective discussion of metacognition is a salient feature of self-critical and self-regulating social groups.  The activities of strategy selection and application include those concerned with an ongoing attempt to plan, check, monitor, select, revise, evaluate, etc.

Metacognition is 'stable' in that learners' initial decisions derive from the pertinent facts about their cognition through years of learning experience. Simultaneously, it is also 'situated' in the sense that it depends on learners' familiarity with the task, motivation, emotion, and so forth. Individuals need to regulate their thoughts about the strategy they are using and adjust it based on the situation to which the strategy is being applied.  At a professional level, this has led to emphasis on the development of reflective practice, particularly in the education and health-care professions.

Recently, the notion has been applied to the study of second language learners in the field of TESOL and applied linguistics in general (e.g., Wenden, 1987; Zhang, 2001, 2010). This new development has been much related to Flavell (1979), where the notion of metacognition is elaborated within a tripartite theoretical framework. Learner metacognition is defined and investigated by examining their person knowledge, task knowledge and strategy knowledge.

Wenden (1991) has proposed and used this framework and Zhang (2001) has adopted this approach and investigated second language learners' metacognition or metacognitive knowledge. In addition to exploring the relationships between learner metacognition and performance, researchers are also interested in the effects of metacognitively-oriented strategic instruction on reading comprehension (e.g., Garner, 1994, in first language contexts, and Chamot, 2005; Zhang, 2010). The efforts are aimed at developing learner autonomy, interdependence and self-regulation.

Metacognition helps people to perform many cognitive tasks more effectively. Strategies for promoting metacognition include self-questioning (e.g. "What do I already know about this topic? How have I solved problems like this before?"), thinking aloud while performing a task, and making graphic representations (e.g. concept maps, flow charts, semantic webs) of one's thoughts and knowledge.  Carr, 2002, argues that the physical act of writing plays a large part in the development of metacognitive skills.

Strategy Evaluation matrices (SEM) can help to improve the knowledge of cognition component of metacognition.  The SEM works by identifying the declarative (Column 1), procedural (Column 2) and conditional (Column 3 and 4) knowledge about specific strategies.  The SEM can help individuals identify the strength and weaknesses about certain strategies as well as introduce them to new strategies that they can add to their repertoire.

A regulation checklist (RC) is a useful strategy for improving the regulation of cognition aspect of one's metacognition. RCs help individuals to implement a sequence of thoughts that allow them to go over their own metacognition. King (1991) found that fifth-grade students who used a regulation checklist outperformed control students when looking at a variety of questions including written problem solving, asking strategic questions, and elaborating information.

Examples of strategies that can be taught to students are word analysis skills, active reading strategies, listening skills, organizational skills and creating mnemonic devices.

Walker and Walker have developed a model of metacognition in school learning termed Steering Cognition, which describes the capacity of the mind to exert conscious control over its reasoning and processing strategies in relation to the external learning task. Studies have shown that pupils with an ability to exert metacognitive regulation over their attentional and reasoning strategies used when engaged in maths, and then shift those strategies when engaged in science or then English literature learning, associate with higher academic outcomes at secondary school.

Metastrategic knowledge
"Metastrategic knowledge" (MSK) is a sub-component of metacognition that is defined as general knowledge about higher order thinking strategies. MSK had been defined as "general knowledge about the cognitive procedures that are being manipulated". The knowledge involved in MSK consists of "making generalizations and drawing rules regarding a thinking strategy" and of "naming" the thinking strategy.

The important conscious act of a metastrategic strategy is the "conscious" awareness that one is performing a form of higher order thinking. MSK is an awareness of the type of thinking strategies being used in specific instances and it consists of the following abilities: making generalizations and drawing rules regarding a thinking strategy, naming the thinking strategy, explaining when, why and how such a thinking strategy should be used, when it should not be used, what are the disadvantages of not using appropriate strategies, and what task characteristics call for the use of the strategy.

MSK deals with the broader picture of the conceptual problem. It creates rules to describe and understand the physical world around the people who utilize these processes called higher-order thinking. This is the capability of the individual to take apart complex problems in order to understand the components in problem. These are the building blocks to understanding the "big picture" (of the main problem) through reflection and problem solving.

Action

Both social and cognitive dimensions of sporting expertise can be adequately explained from a metacognitive perspective according to recent research. The potential of metacognitive inferences and domain-general skills including psychological skills training are integral to the genesis of expert performance. Moreover, the contribution of both mental imagery (e.g., mental practice) and attentional strategies (e.g., routines) to our understanding of expertise and metacognition is noteworthy.
The potential of metacognition to illuminate our understanding of action was first highlighted by Aidan Moran who discussed the role of meta-attention in 1996. A recent research initiative, a research seminar series called META funded by the BPS, is exploring the role of the related constructs of meta-motivation, meta-emotion, and thinking and action (metacognition).

Mental illness

Sparks of interest
In the context of mental health, metacognition can be loosely defined as the process that "reinforces one's subjective sense of being a self and allows for becoming aware that some of one's thoughts and feelings are symptoms of an illness". The interest in metacognition emerged from a concern for an individual's ability to understand their own mental status compared to others as well as the ability to cope with the source of their distress. These insights into an individual's mental health status can have a profound effect on overall prognosis and recovery.
Metacognition brings many unique insights into the normal daily functioning of a human being. It also demonstrates that a lack of these insights compromises 'normal' functioning. This leads to less healthy functioning. In the autism spectrum, it is speculated that there is a profound deficit in Theory of Mind.
In people who identify as alcoholics, there is a belief that the need to control cognition is an independent predictor of alcohol use over anxiety. Alcohol may be used as a coping strategy for controlling unwanted thoughts and emotions formed by negative perceptions. This is sometimes referred to as self medication.

Implications

Adrian Wells' and Gerald Matthews' theory proposes that when faced with an undesired choice, an individual can operate in two distinct modes: "object" and "metacognitive". Object mode interprets perceived stimuli as truth, where metacognitive mode understands thoughts as cues that have to be weighted and evaluated. They are not as easily trusted. There are targeted interventions unique of each patient, that gives rise to the belief that assistance in increasing metacognition in people diagnosed with schizophrenia is possible through tailored psychotherapy. With a customized therapy in place, clients then have the potential to develop greater ability to engage in complex self-reflection. This can ultimately be pivotal in the patient's recovery process. In the obsessive–compulsive spectrum, cognitive formulations have greater attention to intrusive thoughts related to the disorder. "Cognitive self-consciousness" are the tendencies to focus attention on thought. Patients with OCD exemplify varying degrees of these "intrusive thoughts". Patients also with generalized anxiety disorder also show negative thought process in their cognition.

Cognitive-attentional syndrome (CAS) characterizes a metacognitive model of emotion disorder (CAS is consistent with the attention strategy of excessively focusing on the source of a threat). This ultimately develops through the client's own beliefs. Metacognitive therapy attempts to correct this change in the CAS. One of the techniques in this model is called attention training (ATT). It was designed to diminish the worry and anxiety by a sense of control and cognitive awareness. ATT also trains clients to detect threats and test how controllable reality appears to be.

Following the work of Asher Koriat, who regards confidence as central aspect of metacognition, metacognitive training for psychosis aims at decreasing overconfidence in patients with schizophrenia and raising awareness of cognitive biases. According to a meta-analysis, this type of intervention improves delusions and hallucinations.

Works of art as metacognitive artifacts
The concept of metacognition has also been applied to reader-response criticism. Narrative works of art, including novels, movies and musical compositions, can be characterized as metacognitive artifacts which are designed by the artist to anticipate and regulate the beliefs and cognitive processes of the recipient, for instance, how and in which order events and their causes and identities are revealed to the reader of a detective story. As Menakhem Perry has pointed out, mere order has profound effects on the aesthetical meaning of a text. Narrative works of art contain a representation of their own ideal reception process. They are something of a tool with which the creators of the work wish to attain certain aesthetical and even moral effects.

Mind wandering

There is an intimate, dynamic interplay between mind wandering and metacognition. Metacognition serves to correct the wandering mind, suppressing spontaneous thoughts and bringing attention back to more "worthwhile" tasks.

Organizational metacognition 

The concept of metacognition has also been applied to collective teams and organizations in general, termed organizational metacognition.

References

Further reading

External links

Cognitive science
Educational technology
Educational psychology
Mind–body interventions